National calendars of the Roman Rite of the Catholic Church are lists of saints' feast days and other liturgical celebrations, organized by calendar date, that apply to those within the nation or nations to which each calendar applies who worship according to the Roman Rite of the Latin Church. Such calendars are "particular calendars" that build off of the General Roman Calendar. National calendars primarily add feast days of saints whose lives profoundly affected the particular nation in question, or whose veneration is especially prevalent there.

National calendars

Angola
 3 January: The Most Holy Name of Jesus – Memorial
 4 February: Saint John de Brito, priest and martyr – Memorial
 13 May: Our Lady of Fatima – Feast
 3 June: Saints Charles Lwanga and companions, martyrs – Feast
 5 August: Our Lady of Africa – Memorial
 28 August: Saint Augustine of Hippo, bishop and doctor of the Church – Feast
 9 September: Saint Peter Claver, priest – Memorial
 3 October: Saint Thérèse of the Child Jesus, virgin and doctor – Feast
 Saturday before the last Sunday in October: Immaculate Heart of Mary – Solemnity
 3 December: Saint Francis Xavier, priest – Feast

Argentina
According to the national calendar of Argentina, as requested by the Argentine Episcopal Conference (CEA) and approved by the Holy See:
 22 January: Blessed Laura Vicuña – Optional Memorial
 24 January: Our Lady, Queen of Peace – Optional Memorial
 25 February: Blessed Maria Ludovica De Angelis, virgin – Optional Memorial
 16 March: Saint Jose Gabriel del Rosario Brochero, priest – Optional Memorial
 27 April: Saint Turibius of Mogrovejo, bishop – Feast
 8 May: Our Lady of Luján, Patroness of Argentina – Solemnity
 15 May: Saint Isidore the Laborer – Optional Memorial
 16 May: Saint Luigi Orione, priest – Optional Memorial
 20 May: Blessed María Crescentia Pérez, virgin – Optional Memorial
 24 May: Mary, Help of Christians – Optional Memorial
 6 July: Blessed Nazaria Ignacia March Mesa, virgin – Optional Memorial
 9 July: Our Lady of Itatí – Memorial
 10 July: Saints Augustine Zhao Rong, priest, and companions, martyrs – Optional Memorial
 16 July: Our Lady of Mount Carmel – Memorial
 23 July: Saint Sharbel Makhlūf, priest – Optional Memorial
 24 July: Saint Francis Solanus, priest – Memorial
 16 August: Saint Rocco – Optional Memorial
 25 August: Blessed María del Tránsito Cabanillas, virgin – Optional Memorial
 26 August: Blessed Ceferino Namuncurá – Optional Memorial
 30 August: Saint Rose of Lima, virgin – Feast
 24 September: Our Lady of Mercy – Memorial
 9 October: Saint Héctor Valdivielso Sáez, martyr – Optional Memorial
 12 October: Our Lady of the Pillar – Optional Memorial
 7 November: Mary, Mother and Mediatrix of Grace – Memorial
 13 November: Blessed Artémides Zatti, religious – Optional Memorial
 17 November: Saints Roque González, Alfonso Rodríguez, and Juan del Castillo, priests and martyrs – Memorial
 18 November: Saint Elizabeth of Hungary – Memorial
 12 December: Our Lady of Guadalupe – Feast
 Saturday of the Second Week of Easter: Our Lady of the Valley – Memorial

Australia
See Liturgy Brisbane
 27 January: Saints Timothy and Titus, bishops – Optional Memorial
 17 March: Saint Patrick, bishop – Solemnity
 26 April: Saint Mark, evangelist – Feast
 27 April: Saint Louis Grignion de Montfort, priest – Optional Memorial
 28 April: Saint Peter Chanel, priest and martyr – Memorial
 24 May: Our Lady, Help of Christians – Solemnity
 6 June: Saint Marcellin Champagnat, priest – Optional Memorial
 22 June: Saints John Fisher, bishop, and Thomas More, martyrs – Memorial
 7 July: Blessed Peter To Rot, martyr – Optional Memorial
 3 August: Saint Dominic, priest – Memorial
 8 August: Saint Mary of the Cross, virgin – Solemnity

Austria, Germany, Switzerland, German-speaking dioceses
The Episcopal Conferences of Austria, Germany, and Switzerland share one regional calendar, the Regionalkalender für das deutsche Sprachgebiet ("Regional calendar for the German language area"). It applies in Germany, Austria and Switzerland as well as in the dioceses of Luxembourg, Liège, Metz, Strasbourg, Vaduz and Bozen-Brixen.

From Das Stundenbuch Online
 5 January: Saint John Neumann, bishop – Optional Memorial
 7 January: Saint Valentine of Raetia, bishop – Optional Memorial or Saint Raymond of Penyafort, founder of a religious order – Optional Memorial (1275)
 8 January: Saint Severinus of Noricum, monk – Optional Memorial
 13 January: Saint Hilary of Poitiers, father of the church – Optional Memorial
 17 January: Saint Antony, desert father in Egypt
 21 January: Saint Meinrad, martyr – Optional Memorial
 23 January: Blessed Henry Suso, priest – Optional Memorial
 4 February: Saint Rabanus Maurus, bishop – Optional Memorial
 14 February: Saints Cyril, monk and Methodius, bishop – Feast
 24 February: Saint Matthias, apostle – Feast
 25 February: Saint Walburga, abbess – Optional Memorial
 6 March: Saint Fridolin of Säckingen, monk – Optional Memorial
 9 March: Saint Bruno of Querfurt, bishop – Optional Memorial
 14 March: Saint Matilda – Optional Memorial
 15 March: Saint Clement Mary Hofbauer, priest – Optional Memorial
 17 March: Saint Gertrude of Nivelles, abbess – Optional Memorial
 26 March: Saint Ludger, bishop – Optional Memorial
 19 April: Saint Leo IX, pope or Blessed Marcel Callo, martyr – Optional Memorial
 21 April: Saint Conrad of Parzham, religious – Optional Memorial
 27 April: Saint Peter Canisius, priest and doctor – Optional Memorial
 29 April: Saint Catherine of Siena, virgin and doctor – Feast
 4 May: Saint Florian and his companions, martyrs – Optional Memorial
 5 May: Saint Gotthard, bishop – Optional Memorial
 16 May: Saint John Nepomucene, priest and martyr – Optional Memorial
 21 May: Saint Hermann Joseph, priest – Optional Memorial
 15 June: Saint Vitus, martyr – Optional Memorial
 16 June: Saint Benno of Meissen, bishop – Optional Memorial
 27 June: Saint Hemma of Gurk – Optional Memorial
 30 June: Saint Otto of Bamberg, bishop – Optional Memorial
 2 July: Visitation of the Blessed Virgin Mary – Feast
 4 July: Saint Ulrich of Augsburg – Optional Memorial
 7 July: Saint Willibald, bishop – Optional Memorial
 8 July: Saint Kilian, bishop and companions, martyrs – Optional Memorial
 10 July: Saints Canute, Eric and Olaf, martyrs – Optional Memorial
 11 July: Saint Benedict, abbot – Feast
 13 July: Saints Henry and Cunigunde – Optional Memorial
 20 July: Saint Margaret of Antioch, virgin and martyr – Optional Memorial
 23 July: Saint Brigitta, religious – Feast
 24 July: Saint Christopher, martyr – Optional Memorial
 9 August: Saint Teresa Benedicta of the Cross, virgin and martyr – Feast
 31 August: Saint Paulinus of Trier, bishop – Optional Memorial
 17 September: Saint Hildegard of Bingen, abbess and doctor – Optional Memorial
 18 September: Saint Lambert of Maastricht, bishop and martyr – Optional Memorial
 22 September: Saint Maurice and companions, martyrs – Optional Memorial
 24 September: Saints Rupert and Virgilius of Salzburg, bishops – Optional Memorial
 25 September: Saint Nicholas of Flüe, hermit – Optional Memorial
 28 September: Saint Leoba, abbess – Optional Memorial
 16 October: Saint Gall, abbot – Optional Memorial
 20 October: Saint Wendelin, abbot – Optional Memorial
 21 October: Saint Ursula and companions, virgins and martyrs – Optional Memorial
 31 October: Saint Wolfgang of Regensburg, bishop – Optional Memorial
 3 November: Saint Hubert of Liege, bishop, or Saint Pirmin, abbot and bishop, or Blessed Rupert Mayer, priest – Optional Memorials
 6 November: Saint Leonard of Noblac, hermit – Optional Memorial
 7 November: Saint Willibrord, bishop – Optional Memorial
 15 November: Saint Leopold III – Optional Memorial
 17 November: Saint Gertrude the Great, virgin – Optional Memorial
 19 November: Saint Elizabeth of Hungary, religious – Memorial
 20 November: Saint Corbinian, bishop – Optional Memorial
 26 November: Saints Conrad and Gebhard of Constance, bishops – Optional Memorial
 2 December: Saint Lucius of Chur, bishop and martyr – Optional Memorial
 4 December: Saint Barbara, virgin and martyr or Blessed Adolph Kolping, priest – Optional Memorials
 5 December: Saint Anno II, bishop – Optional Memorial
 13 December: Saint Odile of Alsace, abbess – Optional Memorial

Belgium
From Calendrier Liturgique à l’usage des diocèses belges francophone and Liturgische Kalender voor de Eucharistieviering.
 30 January: Saint Brother Mutien-Marie, religious – Optional Memorial
 6 February: Saint Amand, missionary – Memorial
 7 February: Saints Paul Miki and companions, martyrs – Memorial
 18 February: Saint Bernadette Soubirous, religious – Optional Memorial
 10 May: Saint Father Damien, missionary – Memorial
 10 June: Blessed Edward Poppe, priest – Optional Memorial
 7 August: Saint Juliana of Liège, virgin – Optional Memorial
 31 August: Our Lady, Mediatrix – Optional Memorial
 17 September: Saint Lambert, bishop and martyr – Optional Memorial
 3 November: Saint Hubert, bishop – Optional Memorial
 26 November: Saint John Berchmans, religious – Optional memorial

Bolivia
 6 February: Saints Felipe de Jesús, Paul Miki and companions, martyrs – Memorial
 23 March: Saint Turibius of Mogrovejo, bishop – Memorial
 25 May: Saint Mariana de Jesús de Paredes, virgin – Optional Memorial
 9 July: Blessed Nazaria Ignacia March, religious – Memorial
 12 July: Saint Camillus de Lellis, priest – Optional Memorial
 14 July: Saint Francis Solanus, priest – Feast
 16 July: Our Lady of Mount Carmel – Solemnity
 23 August: Saint Rose of Lima, virgin – Feast
 9 September: Saint Peter Claver, priest – Optional Memorial
 18 September: Saint John Macias, religious – Memorial
 9 October: Saint Louis Bertrand, priest – Optional Memorial
 21 October: Saint Miguel Febres Cordero, religious – Optional Memorial
 24 October: Saint Anthony Mary Claret, bishop – Memorial
 3 November: Saint Martin de Porres, religious – Memorial
 19 November: Saints Roque González, Alfonso Rodríguez Olmedo, and Juan del Castillo, priests and martyrs – Memorial
 12 December: Our Lady of Guadalupe – Feast
 Thursday after Pentecost: Our Lord Jesus Christ, the Eternal High Priest – Feast

Bosnia and Herzegovina
 9 February: Saint Scholastica, virgin – Memorial
 10 February: Blessed Aloysius Stepinac, bishop and martyr – Memorial
 14 February: Saints Cyril, monk and Methodius, bishop – Feast
 27 April: Blessed Osanna of Cattaro, virgin – Optional Memorial
 29 April: Saint Catherine of Siena, virgin and doctor – Feast
 10 May: Blessed Ivan Merz – Memorial
 12 May: Saint Leopold Mandić, priest – Memorial
 9 July: Blessed Mary of Jesus Crucified Petković, virgin – Optional Memorial
 11 July: Saint Benedict, abbot – Feast
 13 July: Our Lady of Bistrica – Optional Memorial
 20 July: Saint Elijah, prophet – Feast
 23 July: Saint Birgitta, religious – Feast
 27 July: Saint Clement of Ohrid and Gorazd, bishops and companions – Optional Memorial
 3 August: Blessed Augustin Kažotić, martyr, bishop – Optional Memorial
 16 August: Saint Roch – Optional Memorial
 7 September: Saint Marko Krizin, priest and martyr – Feast
 27 November: Blessed Grazia of Cattaro – Optional Memorial
 14 November: Saint Nikola Tavelić, priest and martyr – Memorial

Botswana, Ghana, Kenya, South Africa and Swaziland
 9 January: Saint Adrian of Canterbury, abbot – Optional Memorial
 20 January: Blessed Cyprian Michael Tansi, priest; or Saint Fabian, pope and martyr; or Saint Sebastian, martyr – Optional Memorial
 1 February:  Blessed Benedict Daswa– Optional Memorial
 26 February:  Saint Alexander of Alexandria, bishop – Optional Memorial
 4 April: Saint Benedict, religious or Saint Isidore, bishop and doctor of the Church – Optional Memorial
 12 April: Saint Zeno of Verona, bishop – Optional Memorial
 20 April: Saint Marcellinus, bishop – Optional Memorial
 28 April: Saint Pius V, pope; or Saint Peter Chanel, priest and martyr; or Saint Louis Grignon de Montfort, priest – Optional Memorial
 30 April: Our Lady, Mother of Africa – Feast
 24 May: Blessed Virgin Mary, Help of Christians – Memorial
 29 May: Blessed Joseph Gerard, priest – Optional Memorial
 12 June: Saint Onuphrius, hermit – Optional Memorial
 28 July: Saint Victor I, pope and martyr – Optional Memorial
 30 July: Saint Justin de Jacobis, bishop; or Saint Peter Chrysologus, bishop and doctor – Optional Memorial
 12 August: Blessed Isidore Bakanja, martyr; or Saint Jane Frances de Chantal, religious – Optional Memorial
 18 August: Blessed Victoria Rasoamanarivo – Optional Memorial
 22 September: Saint Maurice and companions, martyrs – Optional Memorial
 10 October: Saint Daniel Comboni, bishop – Memorial
 20 October: Blessed Daudi Okelo and Jildo Irwa, martyrs – Optional Memorial
 6 November: All Saints of Africa – Memorial
 1 December: Blessed Clementine Anuarite, virgin and martyr – Optional Memorial

Brazil
 9 June: Saint José de Anchieta, priest – Memorial
 9 July: Saint Paulina of the Agonizing Heart of Jesus, virgin – Memorial
 16 July: Our Lady of Mount Carmel – Feast
 17 July: Blessed Inácio de Azevedo, priest and martyr – Memorial
 23 August: Saint Rose of Lima, virgin – Feast
 3 October: Saints André de Soveral and Ambrosio Francisco Ferro, priests and martyrs – Memorial
 5 October: Saint Benedict the Moor, religious – Optional Memorial
 12 October: Our Lady of Aparecida (Nossa Senhora Aparecida), Patroness of Brazil – Solemnity
 25 October: Saint Anthony of Saint Anne Galvão (Frei Galvão), priest – Memorial
 19 November: Saints Roque González, Alfonso Rodríguez Olmedo, and Juan del Castillo, priests and martyrs – Memorial
 12 December: Our Lady of Guadalupe – Feast

Canada
According to the national calendar of Canada, as requested by the Canadian Conference of Catholic Bishops (CCCB) and approved by the Holy See:
 7 January: Saint André Bessette, religious – Memorial
 8 January: Saint Raymond of Penyafort, priest – Optional Memorial
 12 January: Saint Marguerite Bourgeoys, virgin – Memorial
 19 March: Saint Joseph, spouse of the Blessed Virgin Mary, principal patron of Canada – Solemnity
 17 April: Saint Kateri Tekakwitha, virgin – Memorial
 18 April: Blessed Marie-Anne Blondin, virgin – Optional Memorial
 26 April: Our Lady of Good Counsel – Optional Memorial
 30 April: Saint Marie of the Incarnation, religious – Memorial
 1 May: Saint Pius V, pope – Optional Memorial
 4 May: Blessed Marie-Léonie Paradis, virgin – Optional Memorial
 6 May: Saint François de Laval, bishop – Memorial
 8 May: Blessed Catherine of Saint Augustine, virgin – Optional Memorial
 21 May: Saint Eugène de Mazenod, bishop – Optional Memorial
 24 May: Blessed Louis-Zéphirin Moreau, bishop – Optional Memorial
 27 June: Blesseds Nykyta Budka and Vasyl Velychkowsky, bishops and martyrs – Optional Memorial
 26 July: Saint Anne, patron of Quebec, and Saint Joachim, parents of the Blessed Virgin Mary – Feast
 5 August: Blessed Frédéric Janssoone, priest – Optional Memorial
 2 September: Blessed André Grasset, priest and martyr – Optional Memorial
 4 September: Blessed Dina Bélanger, virgin – Optional Memorial
 24 September: Blessed Émilie Tavernier-Gamelin, religious – Optional Memorial
 25 September: Saints Cosmas and Damian, martyrs – Optional Memorial
 26 September: Saints John de Brébeuf, Isaac Jogues, priests, and companions, martyrs, secondary patrons of Canada – Feast
 6 October: Blessed Marie-Rose Durocher, virgin – Optional Memorial
 16 October: Saint Marguerite d'Youville, religious – Memorial
 20 October: Saint Hedwig, religious or Saint Margaret Mary Alacoque, virgin – Optional Memorial
 22 October: Dedication of Consecrated Churches whose date of Consecration is unknown – Solemnity
 12 December: Our Lady of Guadalupe – Feast

Cape Verde
 13 May: Our Lady of Fatima – Memorial
 3 June: Saints Charles Lwanga and companions, martyrs – Feast
 5 August: Our Lady of Africa – Memorial
 28 August: Saint Augustine of Hippo, bishop and doctor of the Church – Feast
 9 September: Saint Peter Claver, priest – Memorial
 Saturday before the last Sunday in October: Immaculate Heart of Mary – Solemnity
 3 October: Saint Thérèse of the Child Jesus, virgin and doctor – Feast
 3 December: Saint Francis Xavier, priest – Feast

Chile
According to the national calendar of Chile, as requested by the Episcopal Conference of Chile (CECh) and approved by the Holy See:
 22 January: Blessed Laura Vicuña, virgin – Optional Memorial
 7 February: Blessed Pius IX, pope – Optional Memorial
 11 February: Our Lady of Lourdes – Memorial
 3 May: Exaltation of the Holy Cross – Feast
 4 May: Saints Philip and James, apostles – Feast
 13 July: Saint Teresa of Los Andes, virgin – Feast
 14 July: Saint Camillus de Lellis, priest, or Saint Henry – Optional Memorial
 16 July: Our Lady of Mount Carmel, Mother and Queen of Chile – Solemnity
 18 August: Saint Alberto Hurtado, priest – Memorial
 26 August: Blessed Ceferino Namuncurá – Optional Memorial
 30 August: Saint Rose of Lima, virgin – Feast
 24 September: Our Lady of Mercy – Optional Memorial
 12 December: Our Lady of Guadalupe – Feast
 Thursday after Pentecost: Jesus Christ, the Eternal High Priest – Feast

China (Taiwan, Hong Kong and Mainland China)
From the website of the Chinese Regional Bishops' Conference
 14 January: Blessed Odoric of Pordenone, priest – Optional Memorial
 15 January: Saint Francis Fernandez de Capillas, priest and martyr – Optional Memorial
 23 January: Saint Lawrence Bai Xiaoman, martyr – Optional Memorial
 27 January: Saint Augustine Zhao Rong, priest and martyr – Optional Memorial
 29 January: Saint Laurence Wang Bing and companions, martyrs or Saint Joseph Freinademetz, priest – Optional Memorials
 13 February: Saint John of Triora, priest and martyr – Optional Memorial
 18 February: Saint Martin Wu Xuesheng and companions, martyrs – Optional Memorial
 19 February: Saint Lucy Yi Zhenmei, virgin and martyr – Optional Memorial
 21 February: Saint Paul Liu Hanzou, priest and martyr – Optional Memorial
 25 February: Saints Louis Versiglia, bishop and Callistus Caravario, priest, martyrs – Optional Memorial
 1 March: Saint Agnes Cao Guiying, martyr – Optional Memorial
 12 March: Saint Joseph Zhang Dapeng, martyr – Optional Memorial
 8 April: Blessed Maria Assunta Pallotta, virgin – Optional Memorial
 4 May: Blessed John Martin Moye, priest – Optional Memorial
 17 May: Saint Peter Liu, martyr – Optional Memorial
 27 May: Saint Peter Sanz, bishop and martyr – Optional Memorial
 29 May: Saint Joachim Ho, martyr – Optional Memorial
 20 June: Saints Gregory Grassi, Francis Fogolla, Anthony Fantosati and companions, martyrs – Optional Memorial
 23 June: Saint Joseph Yuan, priest and martyr – Optional Memorial
 8 July: Seven Martyred Nuns from the Franciscan Missionaries of Mary – Optional Memorial
 9 July: Saint Augustine Zhao Rong, priest and companions, martyrs – Solemnity
 20 July: Saint Leo Mangin and companions, martyrs – Optional Memorial
 21 July: Saint Alberic Crescitelli, priest and martyr – Optional Memorial
 28 July: Saint Paul Chen Changpin and ompanions, martyrs – Optional Memorial
 12 August: Blessed Maurice Tornay, priest and martyr – Optional Memorial
 11 September: Saint John Gabriel Perboyre, priest and martyr – Optional Memorial
 27 October: Saint Francis Diaz, priest and companions, martyrs – Memorial
 7 November: Saint Peter Wu, martyr – Optional Memorial
 27 November: Saint Gabriel-Taurin Dufresse, bishop and martyr – Optional Memorial
 Second Saturday of May: Our Lady of China – Memorial
 Thursday after Pentecost: Jesus Christ, the Eternal High Priest – Feast

Colombia
 23 March: Saint Turibius of Mogrovejo, bishop – Memorial
 3 May: Exaltation of the Holy Cross – Feast
 4 May: Saints Philip and James, apostles – Feast
 19 May: Saint Maria Bernarda Bütler, virgin – Optional Memorial
 26 May: Saint Mariana de Jesús de Paredes y Flores, virgin – Memorial
 28 May: Saint Philip Neri, priest – Memorial
 26 June: Saint Josemaría Escrivá de Balaguer, priest – Optional Memorial
 9 July: Our Lady of the Rosary of Chiquinquirá, Patroness of Colombia – Feast
 10 July: Saints Augustine Zhao Rong and companions, martyrs – Optional Memorial
 16 July: Our Lady of Mount Carmel – Memorial
 17 August: Saint Beatriz of Silva, virgin – Optional Memorial
 19 August: Saint Ezekiel Moreno, bishop – Optional Memorial
 30 August: Saint Rose of Lima, virgin – Feast
 26 August: Saint Teresa of Jesus Jornet e Ibars, virgin – Memorial
 9 September: Saint Peter Claver, priest – Memorial
 26 September: Blessed Paul VI, pope – Optional Memorial
 9 October: Saint Louis Bertrand, priest – Memorial
 21 October: Saint Laura Montoya of Saint Catherine of Siena, virgin and foundress – Memorial
 3 November: Saint Martin de Porres, religious – Memorial
 12 December: Our Lady of Guadalupe – Feast
 Thursday after Corpus Christi: Our Lord Jesus Christ, the Eternal High Priest – Feast

Costa Rica
 15 January: Crucified Lord of Esquipulas – Memorial
 15 May: Saint Isidore the Laborer – Feast
 27 June: Our Lady of Perpetual Help – Optional Memorial
 16 July: Our Lady of Mount Carmel – Memorial
 2 August: Our Lady of Angels – Solemnity
 30 August: Saint Rose of Lima, virgin – Feast
 3 November: Saint Martin de Porres, religious – Memorial
 12 December: Our Lady of Guadalupe – Feast
 Thursday after Pentecost: Jesus Christ, the Eternal High Priest – Feast

Croatia
 10 February: Blessed Aloysius Stepinac, bishop and martyr – Memorial
 14 February: Saints Cyril, monk and Methodius, bishop – Feast
 29 April: Saint Catherine of Siena, virgin and doctor – Feast
 10 May: Blessed Ivan Merz – Memorial
 12 May: Saint Leopold Mandić, priest – Memorial
 4 June: Saint Quirinus of Sescia – Optional Memorial
 9 July: Blessed Mary of Jesus Crucified Petković, virgin – Optional Memorial
 11 July: Saint Benedict, abbot – Feast
 13 July: Our Lady of Bistrica – Feast
 23 July: Saint Birgitta, religious – Feast
 3 August: Blessed Augustin Kažotić, martyr – Optional Memorial
 9 August: Saint Teresa Benedicta of the Cross (Edith Stein), virgin and martyr – Feast
 7 September: Saint Marko Krizin, priest and martyr – Memorial
 14 November: Saint Nikola Tavelić, priest and martyr – Feast

Czech Republic
 18 January: Our Lady, Mother of Christian Unity – Memorial
 23 April: Saint Adalbert, bishop and martyr – Feast
 29 April: Saint Catherine of Siena, virgin and doctor – Feast
 30 April: Saint Sigismund, martyr – Optional Memorial
 8 May: Our Lady, Mediatrix of All Grace – Optional Memorial
 16 May: Saint John Nepomucene, priest and martyr – Feast
 20 May: Saint Clement Mary Hofbauer, priest – Memorial
 30 May: Saint Zdislava – Memorial
 15 June: Saint Vitus, martyr – Optional Memorial
 19 June: Saint John Neumann, bishop – Optional Memorial
 4 July: Saint Procopius, abbot – Optional Memorial
 5 July: Saints Cyril, monk and Methodius, bishop – Solemnity
 11 July: Saint Benedict, abbot – Feast
 14 July: Blessed Hroznata, martyr – Optional memorial
 17 July: Blessed Ceslaus and Saint Hyacinth, priests – Optional Memorial
 23 July: Saint Bridget, religious – Feast
 9 August: Saint Teresa Benedicta of the Cross (Edith Stein), virgin and martyr – Feast
 25 August: Saints Benedykt, Jan, Mateusz, Isaak and Krystyn, martyrs – Optional Memorial
 5 September: Saint Teresa of Calcutta, virgin – Optional Memorial
 7 September: Saint Melchior Grodziecki, priest and martyr – Optional Memorial
 10 September: Blessed Charles Spinola, priest and martyr – Optional Memorial
 16 September: Saint Ludmila, martyr – Memorial
 28 September: Saint Wenceslaus, martyr – Solemnity
 12 October: Saint Radim, bishop – Optional Memorial
 21 October: Blessed Karl of Austria – Optional Memorial
 31 October: Saint Wolfgang, bishop – Optional Memorial
 13 November: Saint Agnes of Bohemia, virgin – Memorial
 1 December: Saint Edmund Campion, priest and martyr – Optional Memorial
 Thursday after Pentecost: Our Lord Jesus Christ, the Eternal High Priest – Feast

Democratic Republic of Congo
 3 June: Saints Charles Lwanga and companions, martyrs – Feast
 12 August: Blessed Isidore Bakanja, martyr – Feast
 9 September: Saint Peter Claver, priest – Memorial
 3 October: Saint Thérèse of the Child Jesus, virgin and doctor – Feast
 1 December: Blessed Clementine Anuarite, virgin and martyr – Feast
 3 December: Saint Francis Xavier, priest – Feast

Denmark
 7 January: Saint Canute, martyr– Optional Memorial
 19 January: Saint Henry, bishop and martyr – Memorial
 31 January: Saint Ansgar, bishop – Solemnity
 1 February: Saint John Bosco, priest – Memorial
 14 February: Saints Cyril, monk and Methodius, bishop – Feast
 29 April: Saint Catherine of Siena, virgin and doctor – Feast
 18 May: Saint Eric IX, martyr – Memorial
 16 June: Saint William of Æbelholt, abbot – Memorial
 10 July: Saint Canute, martyr – Memorial
 11 July: Saint Benedict, abbot – Feast
 12 July: Saint Kjeld of Viborg, priest – Optional Memorial
 23 July: Saint Brigitta, religious – Feast
 29 July: Saint Olaf, martyr – Memorial
 9 August: Saint Teresa Benedicta of the Cross, virgin and martyr – Feast
 30 October: Saint Theodgar of Vestervig, priest – Optional Memorial
 7 November: Saint Willibrord, bishop – Memorial
 Thursday after Pentecost: Our Lord Jesus Christ, the Eternal High Priest – Feast

Ecuador
 9 February: Saint Miguel Febres Cordero, religious – Feast
 20 April: Our Lady of Sorrows of El Colegio – Feast
 23 August: Saint Rose of Lima, virgin – Feast
 24 September: Our Lady of Mercy – Optional Memorial
 10 December: Saint Narcisa de Jesús, virgin – Optional Memorial
 12 December: Our Lady of Guadalupe – Feast
 Thursday after Corpus Christi: Our Lord Jesus Christ, the Eternal High Priest – Feast

England
According to the national calendar of England, as requested by the Catholic Bishops' Conference of England and Wales and approved by the Holy See:
 12 January: Saint Aelred of Rievaulx – Optional Memorial
 19 January: Saint Wulstan, bishop – Optional Memorial
 14 February: Saints Cyril, monk, and Methodius, bishop – Feast
 1 March: Saint David, bishop – Feast
 17 March: Saint Patrick, bishop – Feast
 23 April: Saint George, martyr – Solemnity
 24 April: Saint Adalbert, bishop and martyr or Saint Fidelis of Sigmaringen, priest and martyr – Optional Memorial
 29 April: Saint Catherine of Siena, virgin and doctor – Feast
 4 May: The English Martyrs – Feast
 19 May: Saint Dunstan, bishop – Optional Memorial
 25 May: Saint Bede the Venerable, priest and doctor – Memorial
 27 May: Saint Augustine of Canterbury, bishop – Feast
 Thursday after Pentecost: Our Lord Jesus Christ, the Eternal High Priest – Feast
 9 June: Saint Columba, abbot – Optional Memorial
 16 June: Saint Richard of Chichester, bishop – Optional Memorial
 20 June: Saint Alban, martyr – Optional Memorial
 22 June: Saints John Fisher, bishop and Thomas More, martyrs – Feast
 23 June: Saint Etheldreda (Audrey), virgin – Optional Memorial
 1 July: Saint Oliver Plunket, bishop and martyr – Optional Memorial
 11 July: Saint Benedict, abbot – Feast
 23 July: Saint Bridget, religious – Feast
 9 August: Saint Teresa Benedicta of the Cross (Edith Stein), virgin and martyr – Feast
 26 August: Blessed Dominic of the Mother of God Barberi, priest – Optional Memorial
 30 August: Saints Margaret Clitherow, Anne Line and Margaret Ward, martyrs – Optional Memorial
 31 August: Saint Aidan, bishop and the Saints of Lindisfarne – Optional Memorial
 3 September: Saint Gregory the Great, pope and doctor – Feast
 4 September: Saint Cuthbert, bishop – Optional Memorial
 19 September: Saint Theodore of Canterbury, bishop – Optional Memorial
 24 September: Our Lady of Walsingham – Memorial
 9 October: Saint John Henry Newman, priest – Feast
 10 October: Saint Paulinus of York, bishop – Optional Memorial
 12 October: Saint Wilfrid, bishop – Optional Memorial
 13 October: Saint Edward the Confessor – Optional Memorial
 26 October: Saints Chad and Cedd, bishop – Optional Memorial
 3 November: Saint Winefride, virgin – Optional Memorial
 7 November: Saint Willibrord, bishop – Optional Memorial
 16 November: Saint Edmund of Abingdon, bishop or Saint Margaret of Scotland or Saint Gertrude the Great, virgin – Optional Memorial
 17 November: Saint Hilda, abbess or Saint Hugh of Lincoln, bishop or Saint Elizabeth of Hungary – Optional Memorial
 29 December: Saint Thomas Becket, bishop and martyr – Feast

Finland
From the website of the Catholic Church in Finland
 19 January: Saint Henry, bishop and martyr – Solemnity
 3 February: Saint Ansgar, bishop – Memorial
 14 February: Saints Cyril, monk and Methodius, bishop – Feast
 29 April: Saint Catherine of Siena, virgin and doctor – Feast
 18 May: Saint Eric, martyr – Memorial
 22 May: Blessed Hemming, bishop – Memorial
 29 May: Saint Ursula Ledóchowska, virgin – Optional Memorial
 4 June: Saint Elizabeth Hesselblad, virgin – Optional Memorial
 26 June: Saint Josemaría Escrivá de Balaguer, priest – Optional Memorial
 10 July: Saint Canute, martyr – Memorial
 11 July: Saint Benedict, abbot – Feast
 20 July: Saint Thorlac, bishop – Memorial
 29 July: Saint Olaf, martyr – Memorial
 9 August: Saint Teresa Benedicta of the Cross, virgin and martyr – Feast
 24 September All Nordic Saints, Memorial
 7 October: Saint Brigitta, religious – Feast
 25 November: Blessed Nicolas Steno, bishop – Optional Memorial

France
According to the Calendrier propre à la France
 3 January: Saint Genevieve, virgin – Optional Memorial
 15 January: Saint Remigius, bishop – Optional Memorial
 14 February: Saints Cyril, monk and Methodius, bishop – Feast
 18 February: Saint Bernadette Soubirous, virgin – Optional Memorial
 29 April: Saint Catherine of Siena, virgin and doctor – Feast
 19 May: Saint Ivo, priest – Optional Memorial
 30 May: Saint Joan of Arc, virgin, secondary patroness of France – Memorial
 2 June: Saint Pothinus, bishop, Saint Blandina, virgin, and companions, martyrs – Optional Memorial
 4 June: Saint Clotilde – Optional Memorial
 11 July: Saint Benedict, abbot – Feast
 23 July: Saint Brigitta, religious – Feast
 9 August: Saint Teresa Benedicta of the Cross, virgin and martyr – Feast
 15 August: Assumption of the Blessed Virgin Mary, principal patroness of France – Solemnity
 26 August: Saint Caesarius of Arles, bishop – Optional Memorial
 19 September: Our Lady of La Salette – Optional Memorial
 1 October: Saint Thérèse of the Child Jesus, virgin, secondary patroness of France – Memorial

Guatemala
 15 January: Crucified Lord of Esquipulas – Feast
 24 April: Saint Peter of Saint Joseph de Betancur, priest – Solemnity
 3 May: Exaltation of the Holy Cross – Feast
 4 May: Saint Philip and Saint James, apostles – Feast
 7 October: Our Lady of the Rosary – Feast
 12 December: Our Lady of Guadalupe – Feast
 Thursday after Pentecost: Our Lord Jesus Christ, the Eternal High Priest – Feast

Guinea-Bissau
 2 February: Our Lady of Candles – Solemnity
 13 May: Our Lady of Fatima – Memorial
 3 June: Saints Charles Lwanga and companions, martyrs – Feast
 4 July: Saint Elizabeth of Portugal – Memorial
 5 August: Our Lady of Africa – Memorial
 28 August: Saint Augustine of Hippo, bishop and doctor of the Church – Feast
 9 September: Saint Peter Claver, priest – Memorial
 Saturday before the last Sunday in October: Immaculate Heart of Mary – Solemnity
 3 October: Saint Thérèse of the Child Jesus, virgin and doctor – Feast
 3 December: Saint Francis Xavier, priest – Feast

Greece
 14 February: Saints Cyril, Monk and Methodius – Feast
 18 March: Saint Cyril of Jerusalem – Memorial
 22 April: Saint Adalbert – Optional Memorial
 23 April: Saint George – Memorial
 29 April: Saint Catherine of Siena – Feast
 5 May: Saint Irene – Memorial
 13 May: Blessed Virgin Mary, Mother of the Church – Memorial
 15 May: Our Lady of Fatima – Optional Memorial
 27 June: Saint Cyril of Alexandria – Memorial
 11 July: Saint Benedict – Feast
 17 July: Saint Marina – Memorial
 23 July: Saint Birgitta – Feast
 27 July: Saint Pantaleon – Memorial
 3 August: Saint Lydia of Philippi – Memorial
 9 August: Saint Teresa Benedicta of the Cross (Edith Stein) – Feast
 26 September: Saints Cosmas and Damian – Memorial
 3 October: Saint Dionysius the Areopagite – Memorial
 26 October: Saint Demetrius – Memorial
 21 November: Presentation of the Blessed Virgin Mary – Feast
 4 December: Saint John Damascene or Saint Barbara – Optional Memorial
 6 December: Saint Nicholas – Memorial
 12 December: Saint Spyridon – Memorial

Haiti
 21 January: Our Lady of Altagracia – Memorial
 23 March: Saint Turibius of Mogrovejo, bishop – Feast
 27 June: Our Lady of Perpetual Help – Solemnity
 4 July: All Holy Popes – Memorial
 23 August: Saint Rose of Lima, virgin – Solemnity
 9 September: Saint Peter Claver, priest – Memorial
 3 November: Saint Martin de Porres, religious – Memorial
 12 December: Our Lady of Guadalupe – Feast

Hungary
 15 January: Saint Paul the First Hermit – Optional Memorial
 18 January: Saint Margaret of Hungary – Feast
 20 January: Blessed Eusebius of Esztergom, bishop – Optional Memorial
 22 January: Blessed László Batthyány-Strattmann – Optional Memorial
 14 February: Saints Cyril, monk and Methodius, bishop – Feast
 24 February: Saint Matthias, apostle – Feast
 4 March: Blessed Meszlényi Zoltán, bishop and martyr – Optional Memorial
 18 April: Saint Bernadette Soubirous, virgin – Optional Memorial
 23 April: Saint Adalbert, bishop and martyr – Memorial
 29 April: Saint Catherine of Siena, virgin and doctor – Feast
 4 May: Saint Florian, martyr – Optional Memorial
 7 May: Blessed Gisela – Optional Memorial
 11 May: Blessed Sára Salkaházi, virgin and martyr – Optional Memorial
 16 May: Saint John Nepomucene, priest and martyr – Optional Memorial
 17 May: Blessed John Scheffler, bishop and martyr – Memorial
 23 May: Blessed Vilmos Apor, bishop and martyr – Optional Memorial
 24 May: Our Lady, Help of Christians – Memorial
 30 May: The Translation of the relic of Saint Stephen – Optional Memorial
 8 June: Saint Agnes of Bohemia, virgin – Memorial
 15 June: Blessed Yolanda, religious – Memorial
 27 June: Saint Ladislaus – Feast
 2 July: Visitation of the Blessed Virgin Mary – Feast
 11 July: Saint Benedict, abbot – Feast
 17 July: Saints Andrew-Zoerardus and Benedict, hermits – Memorial
 23 July: Saint Brigitta, religious – Feast
 24 July: Saint Kinga, virgin – Memorial
 9 August: Saint Teresa Benedicta of the Cross, virgin and martyr – Feast
 13 August: Blessed Innocent XI, pope – Memorial
 19 August: Saint Bernard of Clairvaux, abbot and doctor of the Church – Memorial
 20 August: Saint Stephen of Hungary – Solemnity
 5 September: Saint Teresa of Calcutta, virgin – Optional Memorial
 7 September: Saints Marko Krizin, Melichar Grodecki and Stephen Pongrác, priests and martyrs – Feast
 24 September: Saint Gerard, bishop and martyr– Feast
 8 October: Our Lady of Hungary – Solemnity
 25 October: Saint Maurus, bishop – Memorial
 31 October: Blessed Theodore Romzha, bishop and martyr – Optional Memorial
 5 November: Saint Emeric – Feast
 13 November: All Saints and Blesseds of Hungary – Optional Memorial
 17 November: Saint Gertrude the Great, virgin – Optional Memorial
 19 November: Saint Elizabeth of Hungary, religious – Feast

India
 14 January: Saint Devasahayam Pillai, martyr – Optional Memorial
 16 January: Saint Joseph Vaz, priest – Memorial
 4 February: Saint John de Britto, priest and martyr – Memorial
 7 February: Saint Gonsalo Garcia, martyr – Memorial
 18 February: Saint Kuriakose Elias Chavara, priest – Optional Memorial
 25 February: Blessed Mariam Vattalil, virgin martyr – Optional Memorial
 8 June: Saint Mariam Thresia Chiramel, virgin – Optional Memorial
 3 July: Saint Thomas the Apostle – Solemnity
 28 July: Saint Alphonsa Muttathupandathu of the Immaculate Conception, virgin – Memorial
 30 August: Saint Euphrasia Eluvathingal, virgin – Optional Memorial
 5 September: Saint Teresa of Kolkata, virgin – Memorial
 16 October: Blessed Thevarparampil Kunjachan, priest – Optional Memorial
 3 December: Saint Francis Xavier, priest – Solemnity

Indonesia
 17 August : Independence Day – Solemnity
 1 October : Saint Thérèse of the Child Jesus virgin and doctor, Patroness of Indonesian Church – Feast
 1 December : Blesseds Dionisius and Redemptus Indonesia's First Martyrs – Memorial
 3 December : Saint Francis Xavier, priest and patron of Mission of the Indonesian Church – Feast
Nearest Sunday to 15 August : Assumption of the Blessed Virgin Mary – Solemnity (if the nearest Sunday is 17 August, then it will be transferred to 12 August)

Ireland
According to the national calendar of Ireland, as drawn up by the Irish Catholic Bishops' Conference and approved by the Holy See:
 3 January: Saint Munchin, bishop – Optional Memorial
 15 January: Saint Ita, virgin – Memorial
 16 January: Saint Fursa, abbot and missionary – Optional Memorial
 30 January: Saint Aidan, bishop – Optional Memorial
 1 February: Saint Brigid, virgin – Feast
 7 February: Saint Mel, bishop – Optional Memorial
 11 February: Saint Gobnait, virgin – Optional Memorial
 14 February: Saints Cyril, monk and Methodius, bishop – Feast
 17 February: Saint Fintan – Optional Memorial
 1 March: Saint David, bishop – Optional Memorial
 5 March: Saint Kieran, bishop – Optional Memorial
 8 March: Saint Senan, bishop – Optional Memorial
 11 March: Saint Aengus (Oengus), bishop and abbot – Optional Memorial
 17 March: Saint Patrick, bishop – Solemnity
 21 March: Saint Enda, abbot – Optional Memorial
 24 March: Saint Macartan, bishop – Optional Memorial
 1 April: Saint Ceallach (Celsus), bishop – Optional Memorial
 18 April: Saint Molaise (Laisrén, Laserian), bishop – Optional Memorial
 27 April: Saint Asicus, bishop – Optional Memorial
 29 April: Saint Catherine of Siena, virgin and doctor – Feast
 4 May: Saint Conleth, bishop – Optional Memorial
 5 May: Blessed Edmund Ignatius Rice, religious – Optional Memorial
 10 May: Saint Comgall, abbot – Optional Memorial
 15 May: Saint Carthage, bishop (Mochuta) – Optional Memorial
 16 May: Saint Brendan, abbot – Optional Memorial
 3 June: Saint Kevin, abbot – Memorial
 6 June: Saint Jarlath, bishop – Optional Memorial
 7 June: Saint Colman of Dromore, bishop – Optional Memorial
 9 June: Saint Columba, abbot and missionary – Feast
 14 June: Saint Davnet, virgin – Optional Memorial
 20 June: Blessed Irish Martyrs – Memorial
 1 July: Saint Oliver Plunkett, bishop and martyr – Memorial
 6 July: Saint Moninne, virgin – Optional Memorial
 7 July: Saint Maelruain (Maolruain), virgin – Optional Memorial
 8 July: Saint Killian, bishop and martyr – Optional Memorial
 11 July: Saint Benedict, abbot – Feast
 23 July: Saint Birgitta, religious – Feast
 24 July: Saint Declan, bishop – Optional Memorial
 9 August: Saint Teresa Benedicta of the Cross (Edith Stein), virgin and martyr – Feast
 9 August: In the revised liturgical calendar for Ireland, approved by the Congregation for Divine Worship and the Discipline of the Sacraments on 1 October 1998 (Protocol No. 227/97/L), optional memorials of Saint Nathy and Saint Felim were assigned to this day; outside the dioceses that celebrate them with a higher rank, their celebrations are impeded by that of Saint Teresa Benedicta of the Cross, who was later declared one of the patron saints of Europe.
 12 August: Saint Muiredach, bishop, Saint Attracta, virgin, or Saint Lelia, virgin – Optional Memorials
 13 August: Saint Fachtna, bishop – Optional Memorial
 17 August: Our Lady of Knock – Feast
 23 August: Saint Eugene (Eoghan), bishop – Optional Memorial
 30 August: Saint Fiacre, monk – Optional Memorial
 31 August: Saint Aidan of Lindisfarne, bishop and missionary – Optional Memorial
 4 September: Saint Mac Nissi, bishop – Optional Memorial
 9 September: Saint Ciaran, abbot – Memorial
 12 September: Saint Ailbe, bishop – Optional Memorial
 23 September: The celebration of Saint Eunan (Adomnan), abbot as an optional memorial is now generally impeded by the later assignation to this date in the General Calendar of the obligatory memorial of Saint Pio of Pietralcina
 25 September: Saint Finbarr, bishop – Optional Memorial
 3 October: Blessed Columba Marmion, priest – Optional Memorial (in some places)
 9 October: Saint John Henry Newman, priest – Optional Memorial (in some places)
 11 October: Saint Canice, abbot – Optional Memorial
 16 October: Saint Gall, abbot and missionary – Optional Memorial
 27 October: Saint Otteran, monk – Optional Memorial
 29 October: Saint Colman of Kilmacduagh, bishop – Optional Memorial
 3 November: Saint Malachy, bishop – Memorial
 6 November: All Saints of Ireland – Feast
 7 November: Saint Willibrord, bishop – Optional Memorial
 14 November: Saint Laurence O'Toole, bishop – Optional Memorial
 23 November: Saint Columban, abbot and missionary – Memorial
 25 November Saint Colman of Cloyne, bishop – Optional Memorial
 27 November Saint Fergal, bishop and missionary – Optional Memorial
 12 December Saint Finnian of Clonard, bishop – Optional Memorial
 18 December Saint Flannan, bishop – Optional Memorial
 20 December Saint Fachanan of Kilfenora, bishop – Optional Memorial

Japan
 6 February: Saints Paul Miki and companions, martyrs – Feast
 17 March: Our Lady of the Discovery of the Hidden Christians – Feast
 1 July: Saint Peter Kibe, priest and companions, martyrs – Memorial
 10 September: 205 Blessed Martyrs of Japan – Memorial
 28 September: Saint Thomas Rokuzayemon, priest and companions, martyrs – Memorial
 3 December: Saint Francis Xavier, priest – Feast

Korea
 29 May: Blessed Paul Yun Ji-Chung and companions, martyrs – Optional Memorial
 5 July: Saint Andrew Kim Taegon, priest and martyr – Solemnity
 20 September: Saint Andrew Kim Taegon, priest, and Paul Chong Hasang and companions, martyrs – Solemnity
 1 October: Saint Thérèse of the Child Jesus, virgin and doctor – Feast
 3 December: Saint Francis Xavier, priest – Feast

Lebanon
 4 December: Saint Barbara, virgin and martyr – Memorial
 6 December: Saint Nicholas, bishop – Memorial
 24 December: Saint Charbel, priest – Optional Memorial
 9 February: Saint Maroun – Memorial
 23 March: Saint Rafqa (Rebecca), virgin – Memorial
 23 April: Saint George, martyr – Memorial
 1 May: Our Lady of Lebanon – Feast

Lithuania
 27 January: Blessed Jurgis Matulaitis-Matulevičius, bishop –  Memorial
 14 February: Saints Cyril, monk and Methodius, bishop – Feast
 4 March: Saint Casimir – Feast
 9 March: Saint Bruno Boniface of Querfurt, bishop and martyr – Optional Memorial
 23 April: Saint Adalbert, bishop and martyr – Optional Memorial
 29 April: Saint Catherine of Siena, virgin and doctor – Feast
 16 May: Saint Andrew Bobola, priest and martyr – Optional Memorial
 2 July: Our Lady, Queen of Families – Optional Memorial
 11 July: Saint Benedict, abbot – Feast
 23 July: Saint Birgitta, religious – Feast
 9 August: Saint Teresa Benedicta of the Cross (Edith Stein), virgin and martyr – Feast
 17 August: Saint Hyacinth – Optional Memorial
 8 September: Birth of the Blessed Virgin Mary – Solemnity
 5 October: Saint Faustina Kowalska, religious – Optional Memorial
 16 November: Our Lady, Mother of Mercy – Solemnity

Luxembourg
 3 January: Saint Irmine, abbess – Optional Memorial
 14 February: Saints Cyril, monk and Methodius, bishop – Feast
 29 April: Saint Catherine of Siena, virgin and doctor – Feast
 11 July: Saint Benedict, abbot – Feast
 13 July: Saints Henry and Cunigunde – Memorial
 23 July: Saint Birgitta, religious – Feast
 9 August: Saint Teresa Benedicta of the Cross (Edith Stein), virgin and martyr – Feast
 11 August: Blessed Ghislaine – Optional Memorial
 18 September: Saint Lambert of Maastricht, bishop and martyr – Optional Memorial
 3 November: Saint Hubert, bishop – Memorial
 7 November: Saint Willibrord, bishop – Feast
 Second Saturday after the Solemnity of Corpus Christi: Our Lady, Comforter of the Afflicted – Solemnity

Malta
 22 January: Saint Publius, bishop – Memorial
 10 February: Shipwreck of Saint Paul, apostle – Solemnity
 14 February: Saints Cyril, monk and Methodius, bishop – Feast
 25 February: Blessed Maria Adeodata Pisani, virgin – Optional Memorial
 Friday before Good Friday: Our Lady of Sorrows – Feast
 23 April: Saint George, martyr – Memorial
 29 April: Saint Catherine of Siena, virgin and doctor – Feast
 30 April: Saint Pius V, pope – Memorial
 1 May: Saint Joseph the Worker – Memorial
 9 May: Saint George Preca, priest – Feast
 1 July: Blessed Nazju Falzon – Optional Memorial
 11 July: Saint Benedict, abbot – Feast
 16 July: Our Lady of Mount Carmel – Memorial
 23 July: Saint Birgitta, religious – Feast
 9 August: Saint Teresa Benedicta of the Cross (Edith Stein), virgin and martyr – Feast
 8 September: Birth of the Blessed Virgin Mary – Feast

Mexico
 5 February: Saint Felipe de Jesús, priest and martyr – Feast
 25 February: Blessed Sebastián de Aparicio, religious – Optional Memorial
 27 April: Saint María Guadalupe García Zavala, virgin – Optional Memorial
 3 May: Exaltation of the Holy Cross – Feast
 4 May: Saint Philip and Saint James, apostles – Feast
 15 May: Saint Isidore the Laborer – Memorial
 16 May: Saint John Nepomucene, priest and martyr – Optional Memorial
 21 May: Saint Cristóbal Magallanes and companions, martyrs – Memorial
 27 June: Our Lady of Perpetual Help – Optional Memorial
 4 July: Our Lady of Refuge – Optional Memorial
 30 July: Saint María de Jesús Sacramentado Venegas, virgin – Optional Memorial
 16 August: Blessed Bartolomé Días Laurel, religious and martyr or Blessed Pedro de Zúñiga and Blessed Luis Flores, priests and martyrs – Optional Memorial
 26 August: Saint Junípero Serra, priest – Optional Memorial
 30 August: Saint Rose of Lima, virgin – Feast
 19 September: Saint José Maria de Yermo, priest – Optional Memorial
 24 September: Our Lady of Mercy – Memorial
 24 October: Saint Rafael Guízar y Valencia, bishop – Feast
 23 November: Blessed Miguel Agustín Pro, priest and martyr – Optional Memorial
 9 December: Saint Juan Diego – Memorial
 12 December: Our Lady of Guadalupe – Solemnity
 Thursday after Pentecost: Our Lord Jesus Christ, the Eternal High Priest – Feast

Mozambique
 Monday after Pentecost: Our Lady, Mother of the Church – Feast
 13 May: Our Lady of Fatima – Memorial
 3 June: Saints Charles Lwanga and companions, martyrs – Feast
 5 August: Our Lady of Africa – Memorial
 28 August: Saint Augustine of Hippo, bishop and doctor of the Church – Feast
 9 September: Saint Peter Claver, priest – Memorial
 Saturday before the last Sunday in October: Immaculate Heart of Mary – Solemnity
 3 October: Saint Thérèse of the Child Jesus, virgin and doctor – Feast
 3 December: Saint Francis Xavier, priest – Feast

Netherlands
 14 January: Blessed Peter Donders, priest – Optional Memorial
 15 January: Saint Arnold Janssen, priest -Optional Memorial
 14 February: Saints Cyril, monk and Methodius, bishop – Feast
 29 April: Saint Catherine of Siena, virgin and doctor – Feast
 5 June: Saint Boniface, bishop and martyr, and companions, martyrs – Memorial
 14 June: Saint Lidwina, virgin – Feast
 9 July: The Martyrs of Gorkum – Feast
 11 July: Saint Benedict, abbot – Feast
 23 July: Saint Brigitta, religious – Feast
 27 July: Blessed Titus Brandsma, priest and martyr – Memorial
 9 August: Saint Teresa Benedicta of the Cross, virgin and martyr – Feast
 3 November: Saint Hubert, bishop – Memorial
 6 November: The Preachers of the Faith in Netherlands – Feast
 7 November: Saint Willibrord, bishop – Solemnity

New Zealand
 6 February: Waitangi Day
 7 February: Saint Paul Miki and companions – Memorial
 17 March: Saint Patrick, bishop – Feast
 26 April: Saint Mark, apostle – Feast
 27 April: Saint Louis Grignon de Montfort, priest – Optional Memorial
 28 April: Saint Peter Chanel, priest and martyr – Feast
 24 May: Our Lady, Help of Christians – Memorial
 6 June: Saint Marcellin Champagnat, priest – Optional Memorial
 3 August: Saint Dominic, priest – Memorial
 8 August: Saint Mary MacKillop, virgin – Feast

Nigeria
 9 January: Saint Adrian of Canterbury, abbot – Optional Memorial
 19 January: Saint Fabian, pope and martyr; or Saint Sebastian, martyr – Optional Memorial
 20 January: Blessed Cyprian Michael Tansi, priest – Feast
 26 February:  Saint Alexander of Alexandria, bishop – Optional Memorial
 17 March: Saint Patrick, bishop – Feast
 4 April: Saint Benedict, religious or Saint Isidore, bishop and doctor of the Church – Optional Memorial
 12 April: Saint Zeno of Verona, bishop – Optional Memorial
 20 April: Saint Marcellinus, bishop – Optional Memorial
 28 April: Saint Pius V, pope; or Saint Peter Chanel, priest and martyr; or Saint Louis Grignon de Montfort, priest – Optional Memorial
 30 April: Our Lady, Mother of Africa – Feast
 24 May: Blessed Virgin Mary, Help of Christians – Memorial
 29 May: Blessed Joseph Gerard, priest – Optional Memorial
 12 June: Saint Onuphrius, hermit – Optional Memorial
 28 July: Saint Victor I, pope and martyr – Optional Memorial
 30 July: Saint Justin de Jacobis, bishop; or Saint Peter Chrysologus, bishop and doctor – Optional Memorial
 12 August: Blessed Isidore Bakanja, martyr; or Saint Jane Frances de Chantal, religious – Optional Memorial
 18 August: Blessed Victoria Rasoamanarivo – Optional Memorial
 22 September: Saint Maurice and companions, martyrs – Optional Memorial
 1 October: Our Lady, Queen of Nigeria – Solemnity
 3 October: Saint Thérèse of the Child Jesus, virgin and doctor – Memorial
 10 October: Saint Daniel Comboni, bishop – Memorial
 20 October: Blessed Daudi Okelo and Jildo Irwa, martyrs – Optional Memorial
 6 November: All Saints of Africa – Memorial
 1 December: Blessed Clementine Anuarite, virgin and martyr – Optional Memorial

North Africa (Algeria, Libya, Morocco, Tunisia)
The dioceses within Algeria, Libya, Morocco, and Tunisia constitute one Episcopal Conference, and so share one regional proper calendar.
 3 January: Saint Fulgentius of Ruspe, bishop – Memorial
 5 January: Saints Longinus, Eugenius, and Vindemial, bishops and martyrs – Optional Memorial
 8 January: Saints Quodvultdeus and Deogratias, bishops – Optional Memorial
 11 January: Saints Victor I, Miltiades, and Gelasius I, popes – Memorial
 4 February: Saint Celerina and companions, martyrs – Optional Memorial
 7 March: Saints Perpetua and Felicity, martyrs – Feast
 30 April: Our Lady of Africa – Feast
 6 May: Saints James, Marianus, and companions, martyrs – Optional Memorial
 4 June: Saint Optatus, bishop – Memorial
 10 July: Saint Marciana, martyr – Optional Memorial
 17 July: Saint Speratus and companions, martyrs – Memorial
 23 August: Saint Emily de Vialar, religious – Optional Memorial
 27 August: Saint Monica – Feast
 28 August: Saint Augustine, bishop and doctor of the Church – Solemnity
 30 August: Saints Alypius and Possidius, bishops – Memorial
 10 September: Saint Nemesius and companions, martyrs – Optional Memorial
 12 September: Saint Marcellinus, martyr – Optional Memorial
 16 September: Saint Cyprian, bishop and martyr – Solemnity
 30 October: Saints Marcellus and Maximilian of Tebessa, martyrs – Memorial
 5 December: Saint Crispina, martyr – Memorial

Norway
From the website of the Catholic Church in Norway
 8 January: Saint Thorfinn, bishop – Optional Memorial
 19 January: Saint Henry, bishop and martyr – Memorial
 26 January: Saint Eysteinn, bishop – Optional Memorial
 14 February: Saints Cyril, monk and Methodius, bishop – Feast
 16 April: Saint Magnus, martyr – Memorial
 29 April: Saint Catherine of Siena, virgin and doctor – Feast
 18 May: Saint Eric IX, martyr – Memorial
 8 July: Saint Sunniva, virgin and martyr – Memorial
 10 July: Saint Canute, martyr – Memorial
 11 July: Saint Benedict, abbot – Feast
 15 July: Saint Swithun, bishop – Optional Memorial
 20 July: Saint Thorlac, bishop – Memorial
 23 July: Saint Brigitta, religious – Feast
 29 July: Saint Olaf, martyr – Solemnity
 9 August: Saint Teresa Benedicta of the Cross, virgin and martyr – Feast
 25 November: Blessed Nicolas Steno, bishop – Memorial

Panama
 6 May: Saint Martin de Porres, religious – Feast
 23 August: Saint Rose of Lima, virgin – Feast
 9 September: Our Lady of Antigua, Patroness of Panama – Solemnity
 24 September: Our Lady of Mercy – Feast
 12 December: Our Lady of Guadalupe – Feast
 Thursday after Pentecost: Our Lord Jesus Christ, the Eternal High Priest – Feast

Paraguay
 3 February: Saint Blase, bishop and martyr – Feast
 16 July: Our Lady of Mount Carmel – Optional Memorial
 23 August: Saint Rose of Lima, virgin – Feast
 17 November: Saints Roque González, Alfonso Rodríguez, and Juan del Castillo, priests and martyrs – Solemnity
 19 November: Saint Elizabeth of Hungary, religious – Memorial
 12 December: Our Lady of Guadalupe – Feast
 Thursday after Pentecost: Our Lord Jesus Christ, the Eternal High Priest – Feast

Peru
 3 May: Finding of the Holy Cross – Feast
 24 May: Our Lady, Help of Christians – Optional Memorial
 26 May: Saint Mariana de Jesús de Paredes, virgin – Feast
 14 July: Saint Francis Solanus, priest – Feast
 28 July: Our Lady of Peace – Feast
 30 August: Saint Rose of Lima, virgin – Solemnity
 18 September: Saint John Macias, religious – Feast
 24 September: Our Lady of Mercy – Optional Memorial
 28 October: Our Lord of Miracles – Feast
 3 November: Saint Martin de Porres, religious – Solemnity
 12 December: Our Lady of Guadalupe – Feast
 Thursday after Pentecost: Our Lord Jesus Christ, the Eternal High Priest – Feast

Philippines
 15 January: Saint Arnold Janssen, priest – Optional Memorial
 Third Sunday of January: Santo Niño (Holy Child Jesus) – Feast
 6 February: Saints Pedro Bautista, Paul Miki and companions, martyrs – Memorial
 2 April (preceding Saturday if date falls on a Sunday of Lent or within Holy Week): Saint Pedro Calungsod, martyr – Memorial
 15 May: Saint Isidore the Laborer – Memorial
 21 May: Saint Eugene de Mazenod, priest – Optional Memorial
Thursday after Pentecost Sunday: Our Lord Jesus Christ, the Eternal High Priest – Memorial or Feast (in some dioceses)
 16 August: Saint Roch – Memorial
 19 August: Saint Ezequiel Moreno, Bishop – Optional Memorial
 23 August: Saint Rose of Lima, Virgin and Secondary Patroness of the Philippines – Memorial
 28 September: Saint Lorenzo Ruiz and companions, martyrs – Memorial
Wednesday after the Solemnity of Christ the King: Votive Mass for Persecuted Christians 
8 December: The Immaculate Conception of the Blessed Virgin Mary, Principal Patroness of the Philippine Islands – Solemnity (Holy Day of Obligation)
 12 December: Our Lady of Guadalupe, Heavenly Patroness of the Philippines – Memorial

Poland
 19 January: Saint Józef Sebastian Pelczar, bishop – Memorial
 22 January: Saint Vincent Pallotti, priest – Optional Memorial
 14 February: Saints Cyril, Monk and Methodius, bishop – Feast
 4 March: Saint Casimir – Feast
 23 April: Saint Adalbert, bishop and martyr – Solemnity
 24 April: Saint Fidelis of Sigmaringen, priest and martyr or Saint George, martyr – Optional Memorials
 29 April: Saint Catherine of Siena, virgin and doctor – Feast
 3 May: Our Lady, Queen of Poland – Solemnity
 4 May: Saint Florian, martyr – Memorial
 5 May: Saint Stanisław Kazimierczyk, priest – Optional Memorial
 6 May: Saints Philip and James, apostles – Feast
 8 May: Saint Stanislaus, bishop and martyr – Solemnity
 16 May: Saint Andrew Bobola, priest and martyr – Feast
 24 May: Our Lady, Help of Christians – Memorial
 29 May: Saint Ursula Ledóchowska, virgin – Memorial
 30 May: Saint John Sarkander, priest and martyr or Saint Zdzisława – Optional Memorials
 8 June: Saint Hedwig the Queen – Memorial
 12 June: Blessed Antoni Nowowiejski, bishop and companions, martyrs – Optional Memorial
 14 June: Blessed Michael Kozal, bishop and martyr – Memorial
 17 June: Saint Albert Chmielowski, religious – Memorial
 26 June: Saint Zygmunt Gorazdowski, priest – Optional Memorial
 1 July: Saint Otto, bishop – Optional Memorial
 5 July: Saint Anthony Zaccaria, priest or Saint Maria Goretti, virgin and martyr – Optional Memorials
 6 July: Blessed Maria Teresia Ledóchowska, virgin – Memorial
 8 July: Saint John of Dukla, priest – Memorial
 11 July: Saint Benedict, abbot – Feast
 12 July: Saint Bruno Boniface of Querfurt, bishop and martyr – Memorial
 13 July: Saints Andrzej Świerad and Benedict, hermits – Memorial
 14 July: Saint Camillus de Lellis, priest, or Saint Henry – Optional Memorial
 18 July:  Saint Simon of Lipnica, priest – Optional Memorial
 20 July: Blessed Czesław, priest – Optional Memorial
 23 July: Saint Bridget, religious, Patron of Europe – Feast
 24 July: Saint Kinga, virgin – Memorial
 28 July: Saint Sharbel Makhluf, hermit – Optional Memorial
 9 August: Saint Teresa Benedicta of the Cross, virgin and martyr – Feast
 17 August: Saint Hyacinth, priest – Memorial
 26 August: Our Lady of Częstochowa – Solemnity
 4 September: Blessed Maria Stella and companions, virgins and martyrs – Optional Memorial
 7 September: Saint Melchior Grodziecki, priest and martyr – Optional Memorial
 17 September: Saint Zygmunt Szczęsny Feliński, bishop – Optional Memorial
 18 September: Saint Stanisław Kostka, religious – Feast
 5 October: Saint Faustina Kowalska, religious – Memorial
 12 October: Blessed John Beyzym, priest – Optional Memorial
 13 October: Blessed Honorat Koźmiński, priest – Memorial
 16 October: Saint Hedwig of Poland – Memorial
 20 October: Saint John of Kęty, priest – Memorial
 22 October: Saint John Paul II, pope – Memorial
 23 October: Saint Josef Bilczewski, bishop – Optional Memorial
 13 November: Saints Benedykt, Jan, Mateusz, Isaak and Krystyn, the first martyrs of Poland – Memorial
 18 November: Blessed Karolina Kózkówna, virgin and martyr – Memorial
 20 November: Saint Rafał Kalinowski, priest – Memorial
 4 December: Saint Barbara, virgin and martyr – Optional Memorial
 Monday after Pentecost: Mary, Mother of the Church – Feast
 Thursday after Pentecost: Our Lord Jesus Christ, the Eternal High Priest – Feast

Portugal
 11 January: Blessed Gonçalo de Amarante, priest – Optional Memorial
 4 February: Saint John de Brito, priest and martyr – Memorial
 7 February: The Five Wounds of the Lord – Feast
 14 February: Saints Cyril, Monk and Methodius, bishop – Feast
 18 February: Saint Theotonius, priest – Memorial
 20 February: Saints Jacinta and Francisco Marto – Optional Memorial
 8 March: Saint John of God, priest – Memorial
 29 April: Saint Catherine of Siena, virgin – Feast
 12 May: Blessed Joan of Portugal, virgin – Optional Memorial
 13 May: Our Lady of Fátima – Feast
 10 June: Guardian Angel of Portugal – Memorial
 13 June: Saint Anthony of Lisbon, priest and doctor of the Church – Feast
 20 June: Blessed Sancha and Mafalda, virgins, or Blessed Theresa of Portugal, religious – Optional Memorials
 4 July: Saint Elizabeth of Portugal – Memorial
 11 July: Saint Benedict, Abbot – Feast
 17 July: Blessed Inácio de Azevedo, priest, and companions, martyrs – Memorial
 18 July: Blessed Bartholomew of the Martyrs, bishop – Memorial
 23 July: Saint Brigitta, religious – Feast
 9 August: Saint Teresa Benedicta of the Cross, virgin and martyr – Feast
 17 August: Saint Beatrice of Silva, virgin – Memorial
 27 October: Blessed Gonçalo de Lagos, priest – Optional Memorial
 6 November: Saint Nuno of Saint Mary – Memorial
 5 December: Saint Fructuosus, Saint Martin of Dume and Saint Gerald, bishops – Memorial

Puerto Rico
According to the proper calendar of Puerto Rico, as requested by the Puerto Rican Episcopal Conference and approved by the Holy See:
 3 January: Most Holy Name of Jesus or Our Lady of Bethlehem – Optional Memorials
 10 January: Blessed María Dolores Rodríguez Sopeña, virgin – Optional Memorial
 4 May: Blessed Carlos Manuel Rodríguez – Optional Memorial
 16 July: Our Lady of Mount Carmel – Feast
 26 August: Saint Teresa of Jesus Jornet, virgin – Optional Memorial
 30 August: Saint Rose of Lima, virgin – Feast
 10 September: Blesseds Carlos Spínola and Jerónimo de Angelis, priests and martyrs – Optional Memorial
 11 October: Saint Soledad Torres Acosta, virgin – Optional Memorial
 19 November: Our Lady, Mother of Divine Providence, Patroness of Puerto Rico – Solemnity
 12 December: Our Lady of Guadalupe – Feast
 Thursday after Pentecost: Our Lord Jesus Christ, the Eternal High Priest – Feast

Romania
 14 February: Saints Cyril, monk and Methodius, bishop – Feast
 28 February: Saint John Cassian, priest – Memorial
 29 April: Saint Catherine of Siena, virgin and doctor – Feast
 16 May: Blessed Vladimir Ghika, priest and martyr – Optional Memorial
 11 July: Saint Benedict, abbot – Feast
 23 July: Saint Birgitta, religious – Feast
 9 August: Saint Teresa Benedicta of the Cross (Edith Stein), virgin and martyr – Feast

Russia
 27 January: Blessed George Matulewicz, bishop – Memorial
 29 January: Blessed Bolesława Maria Lament, virgin – Optional Memorial
 14 February: Saints Cyril, monk and Methodius, bishop – Feast
 29 April: Saint Catherine of Siena, virgin and doctor – Feast (in European Russia)
 6 May: Saint George, martyr – Memorial
 16 May: Saint Theodosius of the Caves, abbot – Memorial
 27 June: Our Lady of Perpetual Help or Blessed Leonid Feodorov, priest and Martyr – Optional Memorial
 11 July: Saint Benedict, abbot – Feast (in European Russia)
 23 July: Saint Birgitta, religious – Feast (in European Russia)
 24 July: Saint Anthony of the Caves, monk – Optional Memorial
 24 July: Saint Olga – Optional Memorial
 28 July: Saint Vladimir the Great – Memorial
 5 August: Saints Boris and Gleb, martyrs – Optional Memorial
 9 August: Saint Teresa Benedicta of the Cross (Edith Stein), virgin and martyr – Feast (in European Russia)
 26 August: Our Lady of Częstochowa – Optional Memorial
 7 September: Our Lady of Vladimir – Optional Memorial
 5 October: Saint Faustina Kowalska, virgin – Memorial
 30 October: Blessed Oleksiy Zarytskyi, priest and martyr – Memorial
 16 November: Our Lady of the Gate of Dawn – Optional Memorial
 20 November: Saint Rafał Kalinowski, priest – Memorial
 30 November: Saint Andrew the Apostle, patron of Russia – Solemnity
 4 December: Saint Barbara, virgin and martyr – Optional Memorial
 6 December: Saint Nicholas, bishop – Memorial

São Tomé and Principé
 3 January: The Most Holy Name of Jesus – Memorial
 4 February: Saint John de Brito, priest and martyr – Memorial
 13 May: Our Lady of Fatima – Feast
 Saturday following the second Sunday after Pentecost: Immaculate Heart of Mary – Solemnity
 3 June: Saints Charles Lwanga and companions, martyrs – Feast
 5 August: Our Lady of Africa – Memorial
 28 August: Saint Augustine of Hippo, bishop and doctor of the Church – Feast
 9 September: Saint Peter Claver, priest – Memorial
 3 October: Saint Thérèse of the Child Jesus, virgin and doctor – Feast
 3 December: Saint Francis Xavier, priest – Feast
 21 December: Saint Thomas the Apostle – Solemnity

Scotland
According to the national calendar of Scotland, as requested by the Bishops' Conference of Scotland and approved by the Holy See:
 13 January: Saint Kentigern – Memorial
 14 February: Saints Cyril, Monk and Methodius – Feast
 10 March: Saint John Ogilvie – Feast
 17 March: Saint Patrick – Feast
 29 April: Saint Catherine of Siena – Feast
 9 June: Saint Columba – Memorial
 11 July: Saint Benedict – Feast
 23 July: Saint Birgitta – Feast
 9 August: Saint Teresa Benedicta of the Cross (Edith Stein) – Feast
 16 September: Saint Ninian – Memorial
 16 November: Saint Margaret of Scotland – Feast
 30 November: Saint Andrew the Apostle – Solemnity

Slovakia

According to Všeobecný kalendár Rímskej cirkvi a osobitný kalendár diecéz na Slovensku (General calendar of the Roman Church and special calendar of dioceses in Slovakia) as printed in the Slovak translation of Roman Missal, ed. typ. tertia, released in 2021.

 23 April: Saint Adalbert, bishop and martyr – Memorial 
 24 April: Saint George, martyr – Optional Memorial 
 29 April: Saint Catherine of Siena, virgin and doctor of the Church, patroness of Europe – Feast 
 4 May: Saint Florian, martyr – Optional Memorial 
 11 May: Blessed Sára Salkaházi, virgin and martyr – Optional Memorial 
 16 May: Saint John Nepomucene, priest and martyr – Memorial 
 2 July: Visitation of the Blessed Virgin Mary – Feast 
 5 July: Saints Cyril, monk, and Methodius, bishop, Slavic Missionaries, patrons of Europe – Solemnity 
 7 July: Saint Anthony Zaccaria, priest – Optional Memorial 
 11 July: Saint Benedict, abbot, patron of Europe – Feast 
 17 July: Saints Andrew Zorard and Benedict, eremites – Memorial 
 23 July: Saint Bridget, religious, patroness of Europe – Feast 
 27 July: Saint Gorazd and companions – Memorial 
 30 July: Blessed Zdenka Cecília Schelingová, virgin and martyr – Optional Memorial 
 9 August: Saint Teresa Benedicta of the Cross, virgin and martyr, patroness of Europe – Feast 
 18 August: Saint Helena – Optional Memorial 
 7 September: Saints Marko Krizin, Melchior Grodziecki and Stephen Pongracz, priests and martyrs – Memorial 
 15 September: Our Lady of Sorrows, patroness of Slovakia – Solemnity 
 16 October: Saint Gall, priest – Optional Memorial 
 25 October: Saint Maurus, bishop – Optional Memorial 
 26 October: Dedication of consecrated churches whose date of Consecration is unknown – Solemnity 

 2 November: All Souls – Memorial 
 4 December: Saint Barbara, virgin and martyr – Optional Memorial 
 Thursday after Pentecost: Our Lord Jesus Christ, the Eternal High Priest – Feast

Slovenia
 11 January: Saint Paulinus II of Aquileia, bishop – Memorial
 22 January: Saint Angela Merici, virgin – Memorial
 3 February: Saint Blase, bishop and martyr – Memorial
 24 February: Saint Matthias, apostle – Feast
 16 April: Saint Bernadette Soubirous, virgin – Memorial
 29 April: Saint Catherine of Siena, virgin and doctor – Feast
 1 May: Saint Joseph the Worker – Feast
 4 May: Saint Florian, martyr – Memorial
 12 May: Saint Leopold Mandić, priest – Memorial
 16 May: Saint John Nepomucene, priest and martyr – Memorial
 24 May: Our Lady, Help of Christians – Solemnity
 27 June: Saint Hemma of Gurk – Memorial
 5 July: Saints Cyril, monk and Methodius, bishop – Solemnity
 11 July: Saint Benedict, abbot – Feast
 12 July: Saints Hermargoras, bishop and Fortunatus, deacon; martyrs – Memorial
 23 July: Saint Brigitta, religious – Feast
 27 July: Saints Gorazd and Clement, bishops – Memorial
 9 August: Saint Teresa Benedicta of the Cross, virgin and martyr – Feast
 24 September: Blessed Anton Martin Slomšek, bishop – Feast
 3 November: Saint Victorinus of Pettau, bishop and martyr – Memorial
 27 November: Saints Modestus and Virgilius, bishops – Memorial
 6 December: Saint Nicholas, bishop – Memorial
 Monday after Pentecost: Mary, Mother of the Church – Feast
 Saturday following the second Sunday after Pentecost: Immaculate Heart of Mary – Feast

Spain
 9 January: Saint Eulogius of Córdoba, bishop – Optional Memorial
 20 January: Saints Fructuosus, bishop, and Augurius and Eulogius, deacons, martyrs – Optional Memorial
 22 January: Saint Vincent, deacon and martyr – Memorial
 23 January: Saint Ildephonsus of Toledo, bishop – Optional Memorial
 14 February: Saints Cyril, monk, and Methodius, bishop, Patrons of Europe – Feast
 13 April: Saint Hermenegild, martyr – Optional Memorial
 24 April: Saint Peter of Saint Joseph de Betancur, missionary – Memorial
 26 April: Saint Isidore of Seville, bishop and Doctor of the Church – Feast
 29 April: Saint Catherine of Siena, virgin and Doctor of the Church, Patron of Europe – Feast
 10 May: Saint John of Avila, priest – Memorial
 15 May: Saint Isidore the Farmer – Memorial
 17 May: Saint Paschal Baylon – Optional Memorial
 22 May: Saint Joaquina Vedruna – Optional Memorial
 30 May: Saint Ferdinand – Optional Memorial
 9 June: Saint José de Anchieta, missionary – Memorial
 15 June: Saint María Micaela of the Blessed Sacrament, virgin – Optional Memorial
 26 June: Saint Pelagius, martyr – Optional Memorial
 11 July: Saint Benedict, abbot, Patron of Europe – Feast
 16 July: Our Lady of Mount Carmel – Memorial
 23 July: Saint Bridget, religious, Patron of Europe – Feast
 25 July: Saint James, apostle, Patron of Spain – Solemnity
 9 August: Saint Teresa Benedicta of the Cross, virgin and martyr, Patron of Europe – Feast
 19 August: Saint Ezequiel Moreno, bishop – Optional Memorial
 26 August: Saint Teresa of Jesus Jornet e Ibars, virgin – Memorial
 24 September: Our Lady of Mercy – Optional Memorial
 3 October: Saint Francis Borgia, priest – Optional Memorial
 10 October: Saint Thomas of Villanova, bishop – Optional Memorial
 11 October: Saint Soledad Torres Acosta, virgin – Optional Memorial
 12 October: Our Lady of the Pillar – Feast
 15 October: Saint Teresa of Jesus, virgin and Doctor of the Church – Feast
 19 October: Saint Peter of Alcántara, priest – Optional Memorial
 24 October: Saint Anthony Mary Claret, bishop – Memorial
 13 November: Saint Leander, bishop – Optional Memorial
 10 December: Saint Eulalia of Mérida, virgin and martyr – Optional Memorial
 14 December: Saint John of the Cross, Doctor of the Church – Memorial
 Thursday after Pentecost: Jesus Christ, the Eternal High Priest – Feast

Sri Lanka
 16 January : Saint Joseph Vaz – Feast
 4 February: Our Lady of Lanka – Solemnity

Sudan
 8 February: Saint Josephine Bakhita, virgin – Solemnity
 10 October: Saint Daniel Comboni, bishop – Solemnity

Sweden
From the website of the Diocese of Stockholm
 19 January: Saint Henry, bishop and martyr – Memorial
 4 February: Blessed Nils Hermansson, bishop – Optional Memorial
 14 February: Saints Cyril, monk and Methodius, bishop – Feast
 15 February: Saint Sigfrid, bishop – Optional Memorial
 29 April: Saint Catherine of Siena, virgin and doctor – Feast
 18 May: Saint Eric IX, martyr – Feast
 21 May: Blessed Hemming of Abo, bishop – Optional Memorial
 4 June: Blessed Elisabeth Hesselblad, religious – Optional Memorial
 12 June: Saint Eskil, bishop and martyr – Optional Memorial
 25 June: Saint David of Munktorp, abbot – Optional Memorial
 10 July: Saint Canute, martyr – Memorial
 11 July: Saint Benedict, abbot – Feast
 20 July: Saint Thorlac, bishop – Memorial
 27 July: Saint Martha – Memorial
 28 July: Saint Botvid, martyr – Memorial
 29 July: Saint Olaf II, martyr – Memorial
 30 July: Saint Helena of Skövde, martyr – Optional Memorial
 2 August: Saint Catherine of Vadstena, virgin – Optional Memorial
 9 August: Saint Teresa Benedicta of the Cross (Edith Stein), virgin and martyr – Feast
 16 August: Saint Brynolf of Skara, bishop – Optional Memorial
 2 September: Holy Crown of Thorns – Optional Memorial
 24 September: All Saints of Sweden – Optional Memorial
 7 October: Saint Brigitta, religious – Solemnity
 8 October: Our Lady of the Rosary – Memorial
 9 October: Saint Ingrid of Skänninge, religious – Optional Memorial
 25 November: Blessed Nicolas Steno, bishop – Optional Memorial
 Thursday after Pentecost: Our Lord Jesus Christ, the Eternal High Priest – Feast

Uganda
 3 June: Saints Charles Lwanga and companions, martyrs – Solemnity
 20 October: Blessed Daudi Okelo and Jildo Irwa, martyrs – Feast

Ukraine
 5 January: Blessed Marcelina Darowska, religious – Optional Memorial
 30 January: Blessed Bronislaw Markiewicz, priest – Optional Memorial
 14 February: Saints Cyril, Monk and Methodius – Feast
 1 April: Mary, Mother of Mercy – Optional Memorial
 29 April: Saint Catherine of Siena – Feast
 16 May: Saint Andrew Bobola, priest and martyr – Optional Memorial
 21 May: Saint John Nepomucene, priest and martyr – Optional Memorial
 17 June: Saint Albert Chmielowski, religious – Optional Memorial
 26 June: Saint Zygmunt Gorazdowski, priest – Optional Memorial
 8 July: Saint John of Dukla, priest – Optional Memorial
 18 July: Saint Hedwig of Poland – Optional Memorial
 24 July: Saint Olga – Optional Memorial
 28 July: Saint Vladimir the Great – Memorial
 11 July: Saint Benedict – Feast
 23 July: Saint Birgitta – Feast
 9 August: Saint Teresa Benedicta of the Cross (Edith Stein) – Feast
 26 August: Our Lady of Częstochowa – Optional Memorial
 9 September: Blessed Władysław Błądziński, priest and companions, martyrs – Optional Memorial
 18 September: Saint Stanisław Kostka, religious – Memorial
 23 October: Saint Józef Bilczewski, bishop – Optional Memorial
 Monday after Pentecost: Mary, Mother of the Church – Feast

United States
According to the national calendar of the United States,

as requested by the United States Conference of Catholic Bishops (USCCB) and approved by the Holy See:
 4 January: Saint Elizabeth Ann Seton, religious – Memorial
 5 January: Saint John Neumann, bishop – Memorial
 6 January: Saint André Bessette, religious – Optional Memorial
 22 January: Day of Prayer for the Legal Protection of Unborn Children (23 Jan when 22 Jan falls on a Sunday)
 23 January: Saint Vincent, deacon and martyr or Saint Marianne Cope, virgin – Optional Memorials
 3 March: Saint Katharine Drexel, virgin – Optional Memorial
 10 May: Saint Damien de Veuster, priest – Optional Memorial
 15 May: Saint Isidore – Optional Memorial
 1 July: Saint Junípero Serra, priest – Optional Memorial
 5 July: Saint Elizabeth of Portugal – Optional Memorial
 14 July: Saint Kateri Tekakwitha, virgin – Memorial
 18 July: Saint Camillus de Lellis, priest – Optional Memorial

 9 September: Saint Peter Claver, priest – Memorial
 5 October: Blessed Francis Xavier Seelos, priest – Optional Memorial
 6 October: Blessed Marie-Rose Durocher, virgin – Optional Memorial
 19 October: Saints John de Brébeuf and Isaac Jogues, priests, and companions, martyrs – Memorial
 20 October: Saint Paul of the Cross, priest – Optional Memorial
 13 November: Saint Frances Xavier Cabrini, virgin – Memorial
 18 November: Saint Rose Philippine Duchesne, virgin – Optional Memorial
 23 November: Blessed Miguel Agustín Pro, priest and martyr – Optional Memorial
 12 December: Our Lady of Guadalupe – Feast

Uruguay
 19 April: Our Lady of Verdun – Optional Memorial
 27 April: Saint Turibius of Mogrovejo, bishop – Memorial
 8 May: Our Lady of Luján – Optional Memorial
 15 May: Saint Isidore the Laborer – Optional Memorial
 24 May: Mary, Help of Christians – Optional Memorial
 16 July: Our Lady of Mount Carmel – Memorial
 9 August: Blessed Maria Francisca Rubato, virgin – Optional Memorial
 30 August: Saint Rose of Lima, virgin – Feast
 10 September: Blessed Dolores Aguiar-Mella y Díaz and Blessed Consuelo Aguiar-Mella y Díaz, companions and martyrs – Optional Memorial
 24 September: Our Lady of Mercy – Optional Memorial
 8 November: Our Lady of the Thirty-Three, Patroness of Uruguay – Solemnity
 17 November: Saints Roque González, Alfonso Rodríguez, and Juan del Castillo, priests and martyrs – Uruguay
 19 November: Saint Elizabeth of Hungary – Memorial
 12 December: Our Lady of Guadalupe – Feast
 Thursday after Pentecost: Our Lord Jesus Christ, the Eternal High Priest – Feast

Venezuela
 1 February: Blessed Candelaria of San José, religious – Optional Memorial
 9 February: Saint Miguel Febres Cordero, religious – Optional Memorial
 11 February: Our Lady of Lourdes – Memorial
 27 April: Saint Turibius of Mogrovejo, bishop – Memorial
 3 May: Exaltation of the Holy Cross – Feast
 4 May: Saints Philip and James, apostles – Feast
 10 May: Saint John of Avila, priest – Memorial
 13 May: Our Lady of Fatima – Memorial
 15 May: Saint Isidore the Farmer – Memorial
 24 May: Mary, Help of Christians – Memorial
 26 May: Saint Mariana de Jesús de Paredes, virgin – Optional Memorial
 13 July: Saint Teresa of Los Andes, virgin – Memorial
 14 July: Saint Francis Solanus, priest – Memorial
 16 July: Our Lady of Mount Carmel – Feast
 26 August: Saint Teresa of Jesus Jornet e Ibars, virgin – Memorial
 30 August: Saint Rose of Lima, virgin – Feast
 11 September: Our Lady of Coromoto – Solemnity
 18 September: Saint John Macias, religious – Memorial
 24 September: Our Lady of Mercy – Optional Memorial
 9 October: Saint Louis Bertrand, priest – Optional Memorial
 3 November: Saint Martin de Porres, religious – Memorial
 27 November: Our Lady of the Miraculous Medal – Optional Memorial
 12 December: Our Lady of Guadalupe – Feast
 Thursday after Pentecost: Our Lord Jesus Christ, the Eternal High Priest – Feast

Vietnam
 1 January: Holy Mary, Mother of God – Solemnity
 Sunday after 1 January: Epiphany – Solemnity
13 January: Saints Dominic Phạm Trọng Khảm, Luke Phạm Trọng Thìn and Joseph Phạm Trọng Tả, martyrs –  Optional Memorial
22 January: Saints Matthew Alonzo-Leciniana and Francis Gil Fedrich, priests and martyrs –  Optional Memorial
30 January: Saint Thomas Ngô Túc Khuông, priest and martyr –  Optional Memorial
2 February: Saint Jean Théophane Vénard, priest and martyr –  Optional Memorial
13 February: Saints Paul Lê Văn Lộc and Lawrence Nguyễn Văn Hưởng, priests and martyrs –  Optional Memorial
 The Lunar New Year's Eve: Year-end Mass – Lễ Tất Niên (afternoon and evening, Votive Mass) – Memorial
The Lunar New Year's Eve: New Year's Eve's Mass – Lễ Giao Thừa (night, Votive Masss) – Solemnity
The first day of the lunar year (Mồng Một Tết): New Year's Mass (Tết Nguyên Đán, Votive Mass) – Solemnity
The second day of the lunar year (Mồng Hai Tết): Day of Venerating Ancestors (Votive Mass) – Solemnity
The third day of the lunar year (Mồng Ba Tết): Day of Prayer for Sanctifying Works – Solemnity
19 March: Saint Joseph, Principal Patron of Vietnam – Solemnity
25 March: Annunciation – Solemnity (when 25 March falls during the Paschal Triduum, it is transferred forward to the first suitable day during Eastertide)
 1 May: Saint Joseph the Worker – Optional Memorial
 Sunday before Pentecost: Ascension of Jesus – Solemnity
 Sunday before Solemnity of Sacred Heart of Jesus: The Most Holy Body and Blood of Christ  – Solemnity
26 July: Blessed Andrew of Phú Yên, martyr – Optional Memorial
15 August: the Assumption of Mary – Solemnity (holy days of obligation in Ecclesiastical Province of Hanoi)
2 September: Vietnam National Day – Optional Memorial
5 September: Saint Teresa of Calcutta, virgin – Optional Memorial
The Mid-Autumn Festival: Day of Prayer for Children (Votive Mass) – Feast
1 October: Saint Thérèse of Lisieux – Feast
First Sunday of October: Our Lady of the Rosary – Solemnity
24 November: Saint Andrew Trần An Dũng-Lạc, priest, and companions, martyrs, Secondary Patrons of Vietnam – Solemnity (also celebrated on thirty-third Sunday of Ordinary Time)
28 November: Saint Andrew Trần Văn Trông, soldier and martyr – Optional Memorial
30 November: Saint Joseph Marchand, priest and martyr – Optional Memorial
3 December: Saint Francis Xavier – Feast
6 December: Saint Joseph Nguyễn Duy Khang, martyr – Optional Memorial
10 December: Saint Simon Phan Đắc Hoà, layman and martyr – Optional Memorial
18 December: Saints Paul Nguyễn Văn Mỹ, Peter Trương Văn Đường and Peter Vũ Truật, martyrs –  Optional Memorial
19 December: Saints Dominic Bùi Văn Úy, cathechist, Francis Hà Trọng Mậu, Thomas Nguyễn Văn Đệ, Augustine Nguyễn Văn Mới and Stephen Nguyễn Văn Vinh, laymen, martyrs –  Optional Memorial
21 December: Saints Andrew Trần An Dũng-Lạc and Peter Trương Văn Thi, priests and martyrs –  Optional Memorial

Wales
According to the national calendar of Wales,
as requested by the Catholic Bishops' Conference of England and Wales and approved by the Holy See:
 9 February: Saint Teilo, bishop – Optional Memorial
 14 February: Saints Cyril, monk and Methodius, bishop – Feast
 1 March: Saint David, bishop – Solemnity
 20 April: Saint Beuno, abbot – Optional Memorial
 29 April: Saint Catherine of Siena, virgin and doctor – Feast
 5 May: Saint Asaph, bishop – Optional Memorial
 Thursday after Pentecost: Our Lord Jesus Christ, the Eternal High Priest – Feast
 20 June: Saints Alban, Julius and Aaron, martyrs – Optional Memorial
 11 July: Saint Benedict, abbot – Feast
 12 July: Saint John Jones, priest and martyr – Optional Memorial
 23 July: Saint Birgitta, religious – Feast
 23 July: Saints Philip Evans and John Lloyd, priests and martyrs – Observed today where it is the Solemnity of Title, else on 25 October.
 3 August: Saint Germanus of Auxerre, bishop – Optional Memorial
 9 August: Saint Teresa Benedicta of the Cross (Edith Stein), virgin and martyr – Feast
 26 August: Saint David Lewis, priest and martyr – Optional Memorial
 11 September: Saint Deiniol, bishop – Optional Memorial
 9 October: Saint John Henry Newman, priest – Feast
 16 October: Saint Richard Gwyn, martyr – Optional Memorial
 25 October: The Six Welsh Martyrs and companions – Feast
 3 November: Saint Winefride, virgin – Optional Memorial
 6 November: Saint Illtud, abbot – Optional Memorial
 8 November: All Saints of Wales – Feast
 14 November: Saint Dubricius, bishop – Optional Memorial
 10 December: Saint John Roberts, priest and martyr – Optional Memorial

See also 
 General Roman Calendar
 Institutional and societal calendars of the Roman Rite
 Personal jurisdiction calendars of the Roman Rite

References

Liturgical calendars of the Catholic Church
Sacred places and times in Catholic canon law